

Buildings and structures

Buildings
 April 12 – The Radcliffe Camera in Oxford, England, designed by James Gibbs, is opened as a library.
 Mathematical Bridge at Queens' College, Cambridge, England, designed by William Etheridge, is built by James Essex.
 La Vieille Charité almshouses in Marseille completed to the designs of Pierre Puget.
 Work begins on King's Chapel, in Boston, Massachusetts, designed by Peter Harrison.
 Work begins on Reales Astilleros de Esteiro in Ferrol, Spain.

Births
 June 9 – Andreas Kirkerup, Danish architect (died 1810)
 Louis Montoyer, Austrian Netherlands architect (died 1811)
 Angelo Venturoli, Italian architect (died 1821)

Deaths
 January 9 – Henry Herbert, 9th Earl of Pembroke, English courtier and architect (born 1693)
 January 31 – Roger Morris, English architect (born 1695)

References

Architecture
Years in architecture
18th-century architecture